David Helfgott  (born 19 May 1947) is an Australian concert pianist whose life inspired the Academy Award-winning film Shine, in which he was portrayed by actors Geoffrey Rush, Noah Taylor and Alex Rafalowicz.

Biography

Early life
Helfgott was born in Melbourne to Polish Jewish parents Rachel (née Granek) and Elias Peter Helfgott.  He won the state final of the ABC Instrumental and Vocal Competition.

London studies and mental illness 
The awards he won at the Royal College of Music included the Dannreuther Prize for Best Concerto Performance, for his performance of Rachmaninoff's Piano Concerto No. 3, and the Marmaduke Barton Prize.

During his time in London, he began showing more definite manifestations of schizoaffective disorder. He returned to Perth in 1970. The following year he married Hungarian Jewish immigrant Clare Papp, who had four children.  He worked as a rehearsal pianist for the Western Australian Opera Company.

In 1983, his brother Les Helfgott found him a job working at a Perth wine bar called Riccardo's. The co-owner of the bar was a doctor, Chris Reynolds, who played a significant part in Helfgott's rehabilitation and also introduced him to Gillian Murray, whom Helfgott married in 1984.

Shine 
Helfgott was the subject of the 1996 film Shine, which dealt with the pianist's formative years and struggle with mental illness. Helfgott was portrayed by actors Geoffrey Rush (adult), Noah Taylor (teenager) and Alex Rafalowicz (child). His brother Les has described the portrayal of their father in both Shine and in Gillian Helfgott's biography as "all outright lies". David Helfgott's first wife Clare Papp has also said that Peter Helfgott was "quite badly maligned" in the film.

In a letter to the editor of Limelight, published in the September 2013 edition, Margaret and Les Helfgott refer to certain claims made in an article in the August 2013 edition and state that "there was no estrangement from members of Helfgott's family following his return to Australia. On the contrary, he moved straight back into the family home, and was cared for by our family. Dad was not 'overbearing', and his main objection to David's going abroad was his concern for his son's welfare."

Current musical career 
Helfgott generally prefers to perform Romantic music, mostly Mussorgsky, Rachmaninoff, Chopin, Liszt, Schumann and Rimsky-Korsakov. However, his recordings and performances, especially that of Rachmaninoff's Piano Concerto No. 3, have been criticized as "pallid, erratic and incoherent." Of the two commercial recordings released by RCA, the American journal Fanfare Magazine was critical not only of Helfgott himself, but also of his producers, who were "marketing Helfgott's pain." The British magazine Gramophone was similarly scathing about the exploitative nature of their issue, which, the magazine said, falsely marketed Helfgott as an "unsung genius".

On stage, Helfgott is known for his unusual platform manner. In 1997, critic Anthony Tommasini noted that Helfgott "stares into the hall and renders a nonstop commentary of grunts, groans and mutterings".  Of a 1997 Helfgott recital in New Zealand, critic Denis Dutton wrote, "If, as Goethe claimed, architecture is frozen music, David Helfgott is the musician who finally proves the converse: that music can also be melted architecture — a structureless rubble of notes."

Helfgott tours Australia annually and plays a small number of recitals in other countries.

His 2015 European tour was the subject of a documentary, Hello, I Am David!

Personal life 
Helfgott lives in The Promised Land, a valley near Bellingen in New South Wales. His second wife Gillian died in 2022, aged 90.

Discography

Albums
{| class="wikitable plainrowheaders" style="text-align:center;" border="1"
|+ List of albums, with Australian chart positions
! scope="col" rowspan="2" style="width:20em;" | Title
! scope="col" rowspan="2" style="width:20em;" | Album details
! scope="col" colspan="1" | Peak chartpositions
|-
! scope="col" style="text-align:center;" | AUS
|-
! scope="row" | David Helfgott'
|
 Released: 1991
 Format: CD
 Label: 
| align="center" | -
|-
! scope="row" | David Helfgott Plays Liszt|
 Released: 1994
 Format: CD
 Label: Rap Productions (RAPCD 190547-2)
| align="center" | -
|-
! scope="row" | Rachmaninov The Last Romantic|
 Released: 1996
 Format: CD
 Label: BMG Classics (74321 40378 2)
| align="center" | 40
|-
! scope="row" | Shine (soundtrack)|
 Released: August 1996
 Format: CD
 Label: Philips (454 710 2)
| align="center" | 14
|-
! scope="row" | Brilliantissimo|
 Released: April 1997
 Format: CD
 Label: BMG Classics (74321 46725 2)
| align="center" | 40
|-
! scope="row" | Brave New World|
 Released: August 1998
 Format: CD
 Label: BMG Classics (74321 57813 2)
| align="center" | 90
|-
! scope="row" | Pianissimo|
 Released: 2009
 Format: CD, Digital
 Label: Helfgott (2010-01)
| align="center" | -
|-
! scope="row" | With Love|
 Released: 2010
 Format: CD, Digital
 Label: Helfgott (2010-02)
| align="center" | -
|-
! scope="row" | Rach 3  (with Rhodri Clarke)
|
 Released: September 2018
 Format: CD, Digital
 Label: 972235
| align="center" | -
|}

Awards and nominations
Helfgott was awarded an honorary doctorate of music by Edith Cowan University in 2004.

He was awarded the Medal of the Order of Australia in the 2021 Australia Day Honours.

ARIA Music Awards
The ARIA Music Awards is an annual awards ceremony that recognises excellence, innovation, and achievement across all genres of Australian music. They commenced in 1987. 

! 
|-
| 1991
| David Helgott''
| Best Classical Album
| 
| 
|-

Mo Awards
The Australian Entertainment Mo Awards (commonly known informally as the Mo Awards), were annual Australian entertainment industry awards. They recognise achievements in live entertainment in Australia from 1975 to 2016.
 (wins only)
|-
| 1996
| David Helfgott
| Australian Show Business Ambassador of the Year
| 
|-

References

External links

 David Helfgott's official homepage
 Love you to Bits and Pieces at Google Books (Retrieved Wednesday, Jan 10, 2018)
 
 
 

1947 births
Living people
Australian classical pianists
Male classical pianists
Jewish Australian musicians
Jewish classical pianists
Australian people of Polish-Jewish descent
Alumni of the Royal College of Music
People educated at Mount Lawley Senior High School
People with schizoaffective disorder
Recipients of the Medal of the Order of Australia
20th-century classical pianists
21st-century classical pianists
Western Australian Academy of Performing Arts alumni
20th-century Australian male musicians
20th-century Australian musicians
21st-century Australian male musicians
21st-century Australian musicians